Blind Witness is a Canadian deathcore band from Granby, Quebec. Formed in 2005, the group was signed to Mediaskare Records and released two full-length studio albums. The band broke up in 2012, but reformed in 2014.

History 

Blind Witness was founded in 2005, by vocalist Jonathan Cabana in Granby, Quebec along with friends guitarist Pier-Luc Desroches and drummer Kevin Desroches. They later added guitarist/vocalist Maxime Lacroix and bassist Miguel Lepage to the roster. In 2005, the band began performing in Montreal.

In 2007, the band was signed by Victory/Torque Records. Then in 2008, the band released their first full-length album: Silences Are Words.

While writing their follow up album, the group signed to Mediaskare Records and entered the studio to record Nightmare on Providence Street. Released in 2010, the album was met with positive reviews, with Absolute Punk scoring it 84 percent and the reviewer stating that "metal core is one of the most hated genre's of metal. I believe that Blind Witness can prove that wrong to a lot of different metal fans."

In September 2011 it was announced that John Campbell, Maxime Lacroix, Miguel Lepage and Eric Morotti left the band. A few days later Campbell posted, "The band is not broken up. Myself, Miguel, Max and Eric have quit. The band could very well continue with a new line-up. I'm sure something will be posted soon in regards to the continuation of the band, but for now, 4 of the 5 members have quit, and that's that." Cabana wrote, "I'll keep everyone posted soon! We toured a lot and need some time home! I started this band in my basement. I changed a LOT of members through the time! Me and Max are they only original members; Max doesn't want to tour anymore but he still wants to write the new record! Only the people who play live will change, not the music!" A few months later Eric Morotti rejoined the band, along with new guitarist, Olivier Roy, and bassist Francis Beaupré. Lacroix played his last show with the band in October but continued to write and record the band's next record. Nicolas Doiron took the place as the second guitar player for the band.

On February 10, 2012, the band confirmed that they were going into the studio to record their next album in May. On May 25, 2012, they announced their break up. They played their last show in Montreal, Quebec, Canada on August 12 at the Heavy Montréal 2012 festival.

On July 3, 2014, the band announced, "more songs in the making". In the following months, they confirmed that they would be recording and releasing their next album I Am Hell. In June 2015, the released a five-song EP of that name.

Members 
Current members
 Jonathan Cabana – lead vocals (2005–2012, 2014–present)
 Maxime Lacroix – lead guitar, backing vocals (2005–2011, 2014–present), studio songwriting (2010-2012)
 Olivier Roy – guitars (2011–2012, 2014–present)
 Francis "Frank the Tank" Beaupre – bass (2011–2012, 2014–present)
 Pat Woods – drums (2020–present)

Former members

 Samuel Langlois – guitar (2005)
 Maxime Desroches – bass (2005)
 Kevin Desroches – drums (2005–2008)
 Sonny Tremblay – drums (2008)
 Tim Burak – drums (2008)
 Pier-Luc Desroches – guitar (2005–2009)
 Mathieu Paquette – guitar (2009)
 Miguel Lepage – bass (2006–2011)
 John Campbell – guitar (2009–2011)
 Nicolas Doiron – guitar (2011-2012)
 Eric Morotti – drums (2009–2012, 2014–2019)
 Tommy Henderson – drums (2019–2020)

Timeline

Discography 
Studio albums
 Silences Are Words (Torque Records, 2008)
 Nightmare on Providence Street (Mediaskare, 2010)

EPs
 Means/Blind Witness - Split EP (Torque Records, 2007)
 I Am Hell (independent, 2015)

Videography 

"Confessions" (2007)
"Bleeding Blades" (2008)
"Baby, One More Notch" (2010)
"Force Fed" (2020)

References

External links
 
 

Canadian death metal musical groups
Deathcore musical groups
Mediaskare Records artists
Musical groups established in 2005
English-language musical groups from Quebec
Granby, Quebec
Musical quintets